Charles Grenfell may refer to:

Charles Grenfell (1790–1867), MP
Charles Grenfell (1823–1861), MP, son of the above